The Crisis of Zionism is a 2012  book by Peter Beinart. The book describes Beinart's views about the Israeli–Palestinian conflict. Particularly, Beinart contends that policies advocated by Zionists especially under Benjamin Netanyahu's Likud government are increasingly at odds with liberal ideals. He points to Israeli settlements in the West Bank as one troubling aspect of this policy. 

The book originated with a piece published in The New York Review of Books in 2010 entitled "The Failure of the American Jewish Establishment".

The book has been received unfavorably by many pro-Israeli groups. This criticism increased when Beinart called for a boycott of West Bank settlements.

References

2012 non-fiction books
Books about liberalism
Books about politics of Israel
Books about Zionism
Israeli–Palestinian conflict books
Melbourne University Publishing books